Anthurium crystallinum is a species of flowering plant in the family Araceae, native to rainforest margins in Central and South America, from Panama to Peru.

It has gained the Royal Horticultural Society's Award of Garden Merit. Anthurium clarinervium and Anthurium magnificum look very similar, and like Anthurium crystallinum are sold as a house plant for more experienced collectors, as they both need high humidity and light levels.

References

crystallinum
Plants described in 1873
Flora of Panama
Flora of South America
Taxa named by Édouard André
Taxa named by Jean Jules Linden